Nicholas Perricone  is an American celebrity doctor. He is a board certified dermatologist, a businessman, and an author of self-help books about weight loss and maintaining the appearance of youth. He earned his medical degree from Michigan State University College of Human Medicine.  His clinic is on Fifth Avenue in Manhattan.

He opposes the use of Botox.  He argues that exercise, an anti-inflammatory diet plus dietary supplements, superfoods, and topical products can help fight aging and its effects on appearance. His company, N.V. Perricone, M.D. Ltd., sells branded products described in his books and that he markets on shows like Dr Oz, and as of 2008 had $50M in revenue.   According to PEERtrainer, his critics "accuse him of making crazy promises in order to sell product. His claims, it is argued, are backed by very little scientific research, and any research he has done himself has never been published in medical journals, where it would be subject to scrupulous review."

Harriet Hall and Stephen Barrett have written that Perricone's writings "contain many claims that are questionable, controversial, fanciful, unsupported by published evidence, or just plain wrong."

References

External links
Perricone MD

1948 births
American dermatologists
American health and wellness writers
Living people
Michigan State University College of Human Medicine alumni
University of New Haven alumni
Pseudoscientific diet advocates
Celebrity doctors